Yuugg is an Indian actor, writer and director, who predominantly works in Marathi regional films. Some of his roles are Shiva from Karuna Shiv Shankara, starring Vijay Chavhan, Varad Chavhan, Nisha Parulekar and Sam from Duniya geli Tel Lavat, starring Siddharth jadhav, Girish Joshi, Savita Prabhune and jayat Wadkar. He is a writer of the Marathi film Youth, starring Vikram Gokhale, Satish Pulekar, Neha Mahajan and Sayaji shinde.. His recent film is I am not Slumdog I am Indian which released in August 2016. He has written, directed and actor of the film I am not Slumdog I am Indian starring usha Nadkarni, Uday Sabnis, Shamlal, Ajahar Bhatt and Nilambari

Filmography

Films

References

1976 births
Living people